Woodfree uncoated paper (WFU), uncoated woodfree paper (UWF) or uncoated fine papers are manufactured using wood that has been processed into a chemical pulp that removes the lignin from the wood fibers and may also contain 5–25% fillers. Both softwood and hardwood chemical pulps are used and a minor part of mechanical pulp might be added (often of aspen or poplar). These paper grades are calendered.

Properties
Woodfree uncoated papers are of high quality and have a natural look and feel. The properties are good strength, high brightness and good archival characteristics. They provide a non-glare surface suitable for reading and writing.

Special types
Offset paper is a WFU paper with ISO brightness > 80% and a basis weight of 40–300 g/m2. Surface strength and low linting are the main parameters, but brightness and opacity are also important.

Lightweight offset paper, also called onionskin, has a basis weight of 25–40 g/m2 and are normally used for bibles (hence the name Bible paper) and dictionaries.

References

Paper